Barbara Jones is an Irish diplomat who, as of September 2017, serves as ambassador of Ireland to Mexico, in which capacity she is also the named ambassador to Cuba, El Salvador, Costa Rica, Nicaragua, Venezuela, Colombia, and Peru.

References

Ambassadors of Ireland to Mexico
Living people
Ireland–Mexico relations
Year of birth missing (living people)